Synxenidae is a family of bristly millipedes (Polyxenida). Three genera and around 10 species are known. Adult synxenids possess 15 or 17 pairs of legs, with the last two pair modified for small jumps. Adults in most species in this family have 17 pairs of legs, but in two species (Condexenus biramipalpus and Phryssonotus brevicapensis), they have only 15 pairs of legs.

References

Polyxenida
Millipede families
Taxa named by Filippo Silvestri